Paul Williams (born April 14, 1963) is a former American football quarterback who played two seasons in the Arena Football League with the New England Steamrollers and Maryland Commandos. He played college football at Tarleton State University.

References

External links
Just Sports Stats

Living people
1963 births
Players of American football from Houston
American football quarterbacks
Tarleton State Texans football players
Houston Oilers players
New England Steamrollers players
Maryland Commandos players
National Football League replacement players